Ocinaplon is an anxiolytic drug in the pyrazolopyrimidine family of drugs. Other pyrazolopyrimidine drugs include zaleplon and indiplon.

Ocinaplon has a similar pharmacological profile to the benzodiazepine family of drugs, but with mainly anxiolytic properties and relatively little sedative or amnestic effect.

Medical uses
A 2019 review found tentative evidence of benefit in anxiety.

Mechanism of action
The mechanism of action by which ocinaplon produces its anxiolytic effects is by modulating GABAA receptors, although ocinaplon is more subtype-selective than most benzodiazepines.

Availability

Development of ocinaplon is discontinued due to liver complications that occurred in one of the Phase III subjects.

Synthesis

Condensation of 4-Acetylpyridine with N,N-Dimethylformamide dimethyl acetal (DMFDMA) gives the "enamide" (3). This is then condensed with (3-Amino-1H-pyrazol-4-yl)(2-pyridinyl)methanone (4) (96219-90-8). This is the same intermediate as was used in the synthesis of zaleplon in which the nitrile is replaced by a 2-acetylpyridil moiety. This affords the anxiolytic agent ocinaplon (5).

References 

Hepatotoxins
Pyrazolopyrimidines
Sedatives
Pyridines
Ketones
GABAA receptor positive allosteric modulators